Serhiy Serhiyovich Shmatovalenko (or Sergei Sergeyevich Shmatovalenko) (born 20 January 1967 in Odessa) is a retired Soviet and Ukrainian football player and a current coach.

Honours
 1990 UEFA European Under-21 Football Championship winner.
 Soviet Top League winner: 1990.
 Soviet Top League runner-up: 1988.
 Soviet Top League bronze: 1989.
 Soviet Cup winner: 1990.
 Ukrainian Premier League winner: 1993, 1994, 1995, 1996, 1997, 1998.
 Ukrainian Premier League runner-up: 1992.
 Ukrainian Cup winner: 1993, 1996.
 Moldovan National Division runner-up: 2000.

International career
Shmatovalenko made his debut for USSR on 21 September 1988 in a friendly against West Germany in which he scored an own goal. Until 1990 Shmatovalenko still was a member of the Soviet Union national under-21 football team for which he capped 11 games.

On 26 August 1992 he started to play for Ukraine when he participated in a friendly against Hungary.

External links
 
 
 Profile

References

1967 births
Living people
Footballers from Odesa
Soviet footballers
Soviet Union international footballers
Soviet Union under-21 international footballers
Ukrainian footballers
Ukraine international footballers
Ukrainian expatriate footballers
Expatriate footballers in Russia
Expatriate footballers in Moldova
Ukrainian football managers
Dual internationalists (football)
FC Chornomorets Odesa players
SC Odesa players
PFC CSKA Moscow players
FC Dynamo Kyiv players
PFC Krylia Sovetov Samara players
FC Sheriff Tiraspol players
Soviet Top League players
Ukrainian Premier League players
Russian Premier League players
Moldovan Super Liga players
Ukrainian expatriate sportspeople in Moldova
Ukrainian expatriate sportspeople in Russia
Association football defenders